Idhayam is a 1991 Indian Tamil-language romantic drama film directed by Kathir in his directorial debut. It stars Murali and Heera Rajagopal while Chinni Jayanth, Janagaraj, Manorama, and Vijayakumar play supporting roles. The music was composed by Ilaiyaraaja. The film was released on 6 September 1991.

Plot 

Raja, an introverted medical student, falls in love with his fellow college mate Geetha but does not express his love to her. When he decides to convey his love, he misunderstands that Geetha is in love with someone else, but in fact, she was helping her sister and the latter's lover unite. Her father does not accept her sister's love, and the pair commits suicide. Towards the end of the final year of college, Raja finally conveys his love to Geetha when she is in the college mourning her sister's death. On the last day of college, Raja learns that the Geetha is about to be engaged soon to someone else. He could not cope with the news, and he suffers a mild heart stroke and is hospitalised. In the meantime, Geetha falls in love with Raja. She visits the hospital to express her love only to find that he has left to catch a train to his native village. She rushes to the railway station and searches for him. She finds her father on the way, and her father accepts her love, she finds Raja's friend Chinni instead and learns of Raja's heart condition that he cannot digest very happy or sad news. Chinni urges Geetha not to meet Raja then and promises that after Raja recuperates, he will unite them. The film ends as Geetha watches the departing train.

Cast 

 Murali as Raja
 Heera as Geetha
 Chinni Jayanth as Chinni
 Janagaraj as College Professor
 Manorama as Raja's mother
 Vijayakumar as Geetha's father
 Mohan Raman as Doctor
 Typist Gopu
 Kumarimuthu
 Gundu Kalyanam
 Meesai Murugesan
 Krishnan
 Silk Smitha (special appearance)
 Prabhu Deva (special appearance in the song "April Mayilae")
 Raju Sundaram (special appearance in the song "Ooh Party Nalla")
 Bharathiraja as himself (special appearance)
 Gangai Amaran as himself (special appearance)

Production 
Idhayam is the directorial debut of Kathir. Despite her initial apprehensions, Heera was convinced by Thyagarajan to become an actress, and she obliged, crediting the professional approach and continued determination of the film's team to sign her on.

Soundtrack 

Tamil version

The soundtrack for this film was composed by Ilaiyaraaja in his only collaboration with director Kathir. The lyrics for the songs were penned by Vaali and Piraisoodan.

Telugu version

All lyrics for the Telugu dubbed version were written by Rajasri.

Release and reception 
Idhayam was released on 6 September 1991. N. Krishnaswamy of The Indian Express stated, "[T]he unimaginative, half-baked and immature treatment of the story often invites derision." About the cast performances, he said, "Murali, who is more accustomed to action films does not seem to fit into the role [of] the inwardly harried student ... Newface Hira, who has little to do except look serenely at everything around her, is well cast." Krishnaswamy added that Chinni Jayanth was "vibrant as the comedian". The film performed well at the box office, and has since been discussed as a "cult film" in Tamil cinema. The film was dubbed in Telugu under the title Hrudayam.

References

External links 
 

1990s Tamil-language films
1991 directorial debut films
1991 films
1991 romantic drama films
Films directed by Kathir
Films scored by Ilaiyaraaja
Films set in Chennai
Films shot in Chennai
Indian romantic drama films